Brian Danvers Butler (18 April 1876 – 18 August 1916) was an English first-class cricketer and British Army officer.

The son of the Earl of Lanesborough and his wife, Anne Elizabeth Clarke, he was born in April 1876 at Swithland Hall in Leicestershire. In the early years of the 20th century, Butler played cricket for Leicestershire Second XI, though he never featured for the first XI. He later moved to East Grinstead in Sussex, where he was a popular figure who played for East Grinstead Cricket Club, in addition to being a keen golfer. A member of the Marylebone Cricket Club since 1909, Butler made two appearances in first-class cricket for the club in 1913 and 1914, playing against Hampshire on both occasions. 

Butler served in the British Army during the First World War, being commissioned as a second lieutenant in the King's Royal Rifle Corps in April 1915. He was promoted to the temporary rank of lieutenant in September 1915. Butler fought on the Western Front and was killed in action during the Battle of the Somme on 18 August 1916.

References

External links

1876 births
1916 deaths
20th-century Anglo-Irish people
Younger sons of earls
People from Swithland
Cricketers from Leicestershire
English cricketers
Marylebone Cricket Club cricketers
King's Royal Rifle Corps officers
British Army personnel of World War I
British military personnel killed in the Battle of the Somme
Military personnel from Leicestershire